The Yoron language ( Yunnu Futuba) is a dialect continuum spoken on Yoronjima in Kagoshima Prefecture, southwestern Japan. It is one of the Northern Ryukyuan languages, which are a sub-branch within the Japonic language family. The language is one of the most endangered languages in all of Japan.

Dialects 
According to local folklorist Kiku Chiyo, Yoron dialects can be divided into three groups:
Chabana
Asato (/asi⸢tu/), Gusuku (/gusi⸢ku/ ～ /gusu⸢ku/), Ritchō, Kanō (/ha⸢noː/) and Nama (/naː⸢ma/)
Mugiya-higashiku, Mugiya-nishiku and Furusato (/puru⸢satu/)
The Mugiya district is often considered to have a distinct form of accent and intonation.

Folk terminology
According to Kiku Hidenori, who leads conservation activities, people of Yoron Island, Kagoshima Prefecture call their language "Yunnu Futuba." More precisely, a dictionary compiled by his mother Kiku Chiyo (b. 1927) gives /junnuhu⸢tuba/ as the word form of her home community, Mugiya-higashiku. Other words she collected include /junnu⸢jun/ (Yoron accent), /nizjancju⸢jun/ (accent of people of Mugiya-higashiku and Mugiya-nishiku), /sima⸢jun/ (speaking the dialect), /sima⸢guci/ and /simahu⸢tuba/ (the island/home community's language). Yamada Minoru (b. 1916) provides the word forms of the community of Chabana: /⸢ju⸣nnu ⸢fu⸣tuba/ and /⸢ʃi⸣ma ⸢fu⸣tuba/ (the island's language).

Phonology
The following is the phonology of the Mugiya dialect, which is based on Hirayama et al. (1969).

Consonants

Notes
The null onset /∅/ may be added.
N and Q are syllable codas (nasal and geminated stop, respectively).

Vowels

Correspondences to Standard Japanese
Only major sound correspondences are listed.
Standard Japanese  is merged into .
Standard Japanese  is merged into .
Standard Japanese  shows complex correspondences.
Standard Japanese  corresponds to Yoron .
Standard Japanese  that comes from earlier  corresponds to Yoron .

Resources 
 Yorontō-go jien (1995) by Yamada Minoru. The author is from Chabana, Yoron Island of the Amami Islands but also collected data from other communities on the island.
 Yoron hōgen jiten (2005) by Kiku Chiyo and Takahashi Toshizō. A dictionary for Kiku's home community, Mugiya-higashiku, Yoron Island of the Amami Islands.

References

Further reading
Machi Hiromitsu, 1977. Nominalization in Yoron.

Kagoshima Prefecture
Ryukyuan languages